Daniel Victor Stanese (born 21 January 1994) is a Canadian professional soccer player.

Early life
Daniel was born to Romanian parents in Queens, New York and his family moved to Coquitlam, British Columbia when he was six months old. His family later moved to Pitt Meadows, British Columbia, where he began playing soccer with Coquitlam Metro-Ford Soccer Club at the age of 5. He speaks Romanian, French, German and English.

Club career

Youth, College & Amateur
Stanese spent the majority of his youth career with Coquitlam Metro-Ford SC before joining the Vancouver Whitecaps FC Residency program in 2010.  He also spent two seasons with Vancouver Whitecaps FC U-23 in the USL Premier Development League.

On 12 May 2012, Stanese signed a letter of intent to play college soccer at Florida Gulf Coast University.  In what turned out to be his only season with the Eagles, Stanese made 18 appearances and finished the year with one goal.  He went on to be named to the A-Sun All-Freshman team as well as NSCAA All-South Region Second Team.

Professional
On 25 February 2013, it was announced that Stanese had signed with German Bundesliga side 1. FC Nürnberg.  However, his time with the club was cut short and he later joined FC Augsburg where he made 17 appearances for the reserve side in 2013–14.

In October 2016, Stanese signed with VfR Aalen in the German 3. Liga.

After two years with Aalen, Stanese signed a two-year contract with newly promoted club Energie Cottbus.

On 21 January 2020, Stanese joined Carl Zeiss Jena on a deal until the end of the 2019–20 season. Following the club's relegation to Regionalliga, Stanese would be released at the end of the season.

International career
On 19 January 2015, Stanese made his debut for the Canada senior national team. Coming on in the 81st minute for Samuel Piette in a 1–1 draw with Iceland.

References

External links

1994 births
Living people
People from Pitt Meadows
Association football defenders
Canadian soccer players
Canada men's youth international soccer players
Canada men's international soccer players
American soccer players
Canadian people of Romanian descent
American people of Romanian descent
American emigrants to Canada
Canadian expatriate soccer players
Florida Gulf Coast Eagles men's soccer players
Vancouver Whitecaps FC U-23 players
1. FC Nürnberg II players
FC Augsburg II players
VfR Aalen players
FC Carl Zeiss Jena players
Expatriate footballers in Germany
USL League Two players
3. Liga players
Regionalliga players
Expatriate soccer players in the United States
Canadian expatriate sportspeople in Germany
Canadian expatriate sportspeople in the United States